Runaway Romany is a 1917 American silent drama film directed by George W. Lederer and starring Marion Davies, Joseph Kilgour and Matt Moore. Written by Davies herself, the film was given a three-month publicity campaign before its release. However critics felt that the film's dramatic storyline didn't showcase Davies as well as her Broadway comedy roles.

Cast
 Marion Davies as Romany
 Joseph Kilgour as Theodore True 
 Matt Moore as Bud Haskell 
 W.W. Bitner as Zelaya, Chief of the Gypsies 
 Boyce Combe as Hobart 
 Pedro de Cordoba as Zinga 
 Ormi Hawley as Anitra St. Clair 
 Gladden James as 'Inky' Ames

References

Bibliography
 Richard Lewis Ward. When the Cock Crows: A History of the Pathé Exchange. SIU Press, 2016.

External links

1917 films
1917 drama films
Silent American drama films
Films directed by George W. Lederer
American silent feature films
1910s English-language films
Pathé Exchange films
American black-and-white films
1910s American films
English-language drama films